Xylota ignava is a species of hoverfly in the family Syrphidae.

Distribution
This species is common in Europe.

References

Eristalinae
Insects described in 1798
Diptera of Europe
Taxa named by Georg Wolfgang Franz Panzer